Events from the year 1764 in Canada.

Incumbents
Monarch: George III

Governors
Governor of the Province of Quebec: Jeffery Amherst
Colonial Governor of Louisiana: Louis Billouart
Governor of Nova Scotia: Jonathan Belcher
Commodore-Governor of Newfoundland: Richard Edwards

Events

Full date unknown

 1764–1765: The Sugar Act and Stamp Act, by which Britain aims to recover revenue from the American colonies, arouses local opposition.
James Murray becomes civil governor of Quebec, but his attempts to appease French Canadians are disliked by British merchants.
 Canada is divided into two chief judicial districts (Quebec and Montreal). Martial law, in Canada, terminates.
 Fort Erie is constructed. It is the first British fort to be constructed in the Canadian territories which were newly annexed from the French.

Births

Deaths

Historical documents
James Murray promoted from military governor of Quebec City district to governor of province, but other military governors refuse to yield control

"Licentious Fanaticks Trading here" - Murray praises brave and faithful Canadians and denounces British merchants who want them expelled

System of judicial courts and appeals established in Quebec, plus office of bailiff with various duties (judicial and otherwise)

Justices of the peace and grand jury members in Quebec City district disagree on roles, competence, and judicial system of "Infant Colony"

Québécois petition for equality in legal system, including in customs, language, professions and religion, and against anglophone self-interest

£200 reward (upon conviction) for identification of party who seriously wounded Montreal district justice of the peace Thomas Walker at his home

Anyone providing liquor to Indigenous people will be fined £20 (except liquor retailers, who may sell 1/2 pint per person per day)

Circulating library in upper town Quebec City makes hundreds of volumes in English and French available to subscribers for 6p per week

With his family arriving, Quebec City merchant John McCord looks to hire "sober honest middle aged married Couple" or "discreet Woman" as servant

Map: Province of Quebec with adjacent Hudson's Bay Territories, Labrador, Nova Scotia, New England and New York

At Detroit, "most of the French begin to dread that the next Blow from the Indians will be upon them," and so they consume or sell their cattle

Letter from Niagara says troops and "a Party of General Johnson's Indians" are securing site of peace treaty talks with "all the Indian Nations"

At Niagara about 2,000 people representing 22 nations settle peace at meeting ("greatest ever known"), with prisoners released and land ceded

William Johnson tells nations war against English "most unjustifiable," but "his Majesty [has] a Just sense of your ignorance" and offers peace

With kisses, tobacco and feasting, Alexander Henry's adoptive family mollifies bear he shot (Note: "manes" is Latin word for souls of dead)

Lt. Gov. Wilmot of Nova Scotia suggests sending to Caribbean colonies those Acadians who have petitioned French king "to be moved from hence"

Record shows 1,762 Acadians in 405 families still in Nova Scotia (most in Halifax area), plus 300 on St. John's Island

Gov. Wilmot ready to obey instructions to swear and settle Acadians, but finds some so resistant that they would pay their way even to Illinois Country

Nova Scotia laws authorize borrowing sums to pay off bounties and other provincial debts, plus interest on debts in excess of those sums

All previously enacted bounties (except one for building Halifax stone walls) are ended

"As I have some Money to spare, I know not how better to dispose of it" - Benjamin Franklin considers land grants in Nova Scotia and Quebec

"This Island is deem'd very valueable [sic]" - Land speculator describes St. John's Island as "most pleasant fertile and best Cultivated in French America"

Around fifth anniversary of Battle of Quebec, review of troops held near Quebec City, followed by "a very genteel Breakfast" and country dancing

References

 
Canada
64